Gregg William Bergersen (born 1956/57) was a weapons systems policy analyst for the United States Defense Security Cooperation Agency. A director of C4ISR programs, he was found guilty of spying for the People's Republic of China. A resident of Alexandria, Virginia, he sold classified defense information to Tai Kuo, a naturalized citizen originally from Taiwan, who was a New Orleans furniture salesman. Kuo convinced Bergersen that the information would be given to Taiwan, but then forwarded the information to the PRC government. The data outlined all planned sales of weapons and military technology to Taiwan for the next five years. Bergersen was sentenced to 57 months in prison and Kuo received 16 years in prison.

See also
Chinese intelligence operations in the United States

References

External links
http://www.iht.com/articles/ap/2008/02/11/america/Chinese-Spies-Optional.php
http://www.cnn.com/2008/CRIME/02/11/espionage.indictments/index.html
https://web.archive.org/web/20090710000150/http://cbs5.com/national/pentagon.spy.case.2.769687.html

Living people
1956 births
American people convicted of spying for China